Cyperus somaliensis is a species of sedge that is endemic to Somalia.

The species was first formally described by the botanist Charles Baron Clarke in 1895.

See also
 List of Cyperus species

References

somaliensis
Taxa named by Charles Baron Clarke
Plants described in 1895
Flora of Somalia